Bjørnevatn Idrettslag is a Norwegian sports club from Bjørnevatn, Finnmark. It has sections for association football and Nordic skiing.

The men's football team currently plays in the Fourth Division, having had a run from 2008 to 2010 and another single season in 2014. Before 2008 they had been absent since 1998.

Recent history 

{|class="wikitable"
|-bgcolor="#efefef"
! Season
!
! Pos.
! Pl.
! W
! D
! L
! GS
! GA
! P
!Cup
!Notes
|-
|2007
|D4
|align=right bgcolor=gold|1
|align=right|15||align=right|11||align=right|3||align=right|1
|align=right|79||align=right|20||align=right|36
|Not Qualified
|
|-
|2008
|D3
|align=right |7
|align=right|22||align=right|10||align=right|2||align=right|8
|align=right|54||align=right|51||align=right|34
||
|
|-
|2009
|D3
|align=right |4
|align=right|20||align=right|10||align=right|2||align=right|8
|align=right|43||align=right|40||align=right|32
||
|
|-
|2010
|D3
|align=right bgcolor=red|12
|align=right|22||align=right|2||align=right|2||align=right|18
|align=right|24||align=right|88||align=right|8
||1st qualifying round
|1st qualifying round
|-
|2011
|D4
|align=right bgcolor=silver|2
|align=right|18||align=right|13||align=right|1||align=right|4
|align=right|93||align=right|24||align=right|40
||Not Qualified
|
|-
|2012
|D4
|align=right bgcolor=gold|1
|align=right|18||align=right|13||align=right|2||align=right|3
|align=right|58||align=right|24||align=right|41
||Not Qualified
|Promoted
|-
|2013
|D3
|align=right |9
|align=right|22||align=right|7||align=right|5||align=right|10
|align=right|41||align=right|66||align=right|26
||1st qualifying round
|
|-
|2014
|D3
|align=right |11
|align=right|22||align=right|4||align=right|2||align=right|16
|align=right|28||align=right|78||align=right|14
||2nd qualifying round
|
|-
|2015 (in progress)
|D3
|align=right |5
|align=right|16||align=right|6||align=right|4||align=right|6
|align=right|32||align=right|30||align=right|22
||2nd qualifying round
|
|}

References

Official site 
 Bjørneparken Stadium - Nordic Stadiums

Football clubs in Norway
Association football clubs established in 1917
Sport in Finnmark
1917 establishments in Norway
Sør-Varanger